Sport TV is a Portuguese sports-oriented premium cable and satellite television network with seven premium channels in Portugal, one sports news channel and one channel in Portuguese-speaking Africa. The first channel, then only known as Sport TV, was launched on 16 September 1998. It is owned by Altice Portugal, NOS, Vodafone Portugal and Global Media Group (and originally had the participation of RTP).  It is available in almost all television distribution operators in Portugal as a premium subscription channel.

Sport TV broadcasts mainly association football, basketball, volleyball, futsal, rugby, surf, golf, athletics, wrestling, and American sports, combat sports, auto racing, and tennis. It also features debates, news, and sports reports.

All Primeira Liga matches are exclusively broadcast by Sport TV, with the exception of Benfica home matches, which are broadcast on the club's channel, BTV.

History

On 16 September 2005, seven years after the opening of the first channel, Sport TV launched a second channel, SportTV 2. It regularly broadcasts alternative sports such as mountaineering, cycling and radical sports. The channel was available only through ZON TV Funtastic Life package, but the model did not work. They relaunched the channel as a premium channel, also available on Cabovisão and Portugal Telecom's MEO. This was followed in June 2008 by SportTV 3.

Sport TV shown UEFA Euro 2008 in HD, through ZON TV.

On January 22, 2010, the thematic golf channel SPORT.TV Golfe and its HD simulcast, SPORT.TV Golfe HD were launched.

On August 13, 2010, they launched SPORT.TV Liga Inglesa, a HD channel dedicated to the Premier League, broadcasting 380 games and 400 highlights per season, made by the Premier League (also broadcasting on other countries).

On January 7, 2011, SPORT.TV1, SPORT.TV2 and SPORT.TV3 started to broadcast in 16:9.

On August 13, 2011, all of the SportTV main channels started to broadcast in HD and it was launched a new channel, SPORT.TV4, that also is available in HD. At the same time, the Sport TV HD channel ended its two-year run.

On June 5, 2013, Sport TV stopped broadcasting in the United States.

On August 1, 2013, SPORT TV launched a new channel, SPORT.TV Live, replacing SPORT.TV4.

On August 14, 2014, SPORT.TV Live was renamed to SPORT.TV4 again (there's also SPORT.TV4 HD). SPORT.TV Golfe was renamed to SPORT.TV5, which is also available in HD.

Controversies
Sport TV is widely regarded as anti-competitive, since it is the only group of channels in Portugal with the rights to broadcast the Primeira Liga matches (except Benfica home games).

In September 2007, Sport TV sent a cease and desist to a Portuguese live TV streaming website tvtuga.com because the latter was providing links to streams of UEFA Champions League matches that only SPORT TV had the rights to broadcast in Portugal. This has caused great public concern with regard to the monopoly abuse status of the SPORT TV channels.

On 17 January 2011, Sport TV was criticized by Benfica after a match against Académica. Benfica's director of communications at the time, João Gabriel, accused the channel commentators of bias against the club.

Broadcasting rights

Football 
 UEFA Nations League
 UEFA European Qualifiers
 UEFA Europa League
 UEFA Europa Conference League
 Copa América
 CONMEBOL Libertadores
 CONMEBOL Sudamericana
 CONMEBOL Recopa
 Superliga Clasica Quilmes Argentina
 A-League
 Copa Continental Pneus do Brasil
 FA Cup
 FA Community Shield
 EFL Cup
 Serie A TIM
 TIM Cup
 Supercoppa TIM
 Eredivisie
 Liga Portugal Bwin (except S.L. Benfica home matches)
 Liga Portugal 2 SABSEG (except S.L. Benfica B, F.C. Porto B, Sporting C.P. B, Vitória S.C. B and S.C. Braga B home matches)
 Taça de Portugal Placard
 Allianz Cup
 Roshn Saudi League
 Süper Lig

Basketball 
 Euroleague
 Taça de Portugal
 NBA

Rugby union 
 RBS Six Nations
 European Rugby Champions Cup
 Campeonato Português de Rugby

Motorsports 
 Formula One
 MotoGP
 WRC
 International GT Open
 FIA GT Championship
 DTM
 IndyCar Series
 Others, including Portuguese Rally Championship and Weekly magazines (SBK, etc.)

Ice hockey 
 NHL

MMA 
 UFC

Golf 
 Ryder Cup
 U.S. Masters
 U.S. Open
 British Open
 European Tour
 PGA Championship
 PGA Tour
 World Golf Championships

Tennis 
 Davis Cup
 Fed Cup
 Wimbledon
 ATP World Tour Masters 1000
 ATP World Tour

Channels

Current channels

 NBA TV SPORT.TV
 SPORT.TV+
 SPORT.TV 1 (formerly SportTV)
 SPORT.TV 2
 SPORT.TV 3
 SPORT.TV 4
 SPORT.TV 5
 SPORT.TV 6
 SPORT.TV ÁFRICA 1 HD

Former Channels
 SPORT.TV HD
 SPORT.TV LIGA INGLESA
 SPORT.TV LIVE
 SPORT.TV AMÉRICAS
 SPORT.TV ÁFRICA 2
 SPORT.TV 4K UHD

Sport TV Américas
On August 13, 2010, SportTV launched SPORT.TV Américas, a dedicated sports channel for the Portuguese diaspora in North America.  The channel was launched in partnership with American Portuguese-language broadcaster SPT TV.  It airs live football matches every week from the Portuguese First & Second divisions as well as coverage of the League Cup and Portuguese Cup.

On June 5, 2013, for reasons exclusively imputable to RTP - USA Inc. dba SPT (Seabras Portuguese Television), SPORT TV Portugal S.A. was forced to restrain the access to the respective signal in the United States.

Association football programming on Sport TV América includes:

 Primeira Liga (5 matches per week)
 Segunda Liga (2 matches per week)
 Taça de Portugal

SPORT.TV Américas is no longer available in the United States via cable or satellite. It is available online only, through Premium Sports (broadband.premiumsports.tv) in the United States & Canada for a monthly fee of $9.99 or $99 annually. Also on FuboTV (fubo.tv) for a monthly fee of $19.99.

Since June 2016 SPORT.TV Américas is no longer available in the United States via cable, satellite or online. Premium Sports (broadband.premiumsports.tv) stop showing the channel to their yearly customers before the end of their yearly contract. SPORT.TV Américas no longer shows on SPORT TV website.

See also

 A Bola TV
 Eleven Sports (Portugal)
 Eurosport

References

External links 
  

Television networks in Portugal
Mass media in Portugal
Television stations in Portugal
Television channels and stations established in 1998